Zalea is a genus of beach flies in the family Canacidae. All known species are Australasian.

Species
Z. horningi (Harrison, 1976)
Z. major McAlpine, 1985
Z. minor (McAlpine, 1982)

References

Canacidae